Valentina D'Urbano (born Rome, 28 June 1985) is an Italian writer and illustrator. She was the recipient of the Rapallo Carige Prize for Quella vita che ci manca in 2015.

References

1985 births
Living people
Italian women novelists
21st-century Italian women writers
21st-century Italian novelists
Italian women illustrators
21st-century Italian women artists
Writers from Rome
Artists from Rome